Her Most Beautiful Day is a 1962 West German comedy drama film directed by Paul Verhoeven and starring Inge Meysel, Rudolf Platte and Brigitte Grothum.

The film's sets were designed by the art director Emil Hasler and Walter Kutz.

Cast
 Inge Meysel as Anni Wiesner
 Rudolf Platte as Karl Wiesner
 Brigitte Grothum as Inge
 Götz George as Adam Kowalski
 Gert Günther Hoffmann as Erich Seidel
 Axel Scholtz as Herbert
 Rexi Hegyi as Dan, Helens Sohn
 Sonja Ziemann as Helen
 Monika John as Luzie Ritter

See also
 Die Unverbesserlichen (TV series, 1965–71)

References

Bibliography 
 Bock, Hans-Michael & Bergfelder, Tim. The Concise CineGraph. Encyclopedia of German Cinema. Berghahn Books, 2009.

External links 
 

1962 films
1962 comedy-drama films
German comedy-drama films
West German films
1960s German-language films
Films directed by Paul Verhoeven (Germany)
German films based on plays
UFA GmbH films
1960s German films